Richard Oppenheim is a British diplomat who is the ambassador of the United Kingdom to Yemen since 2021. Previously, he was the UK’s Deputy Ambassador to the Kingdom of Saudi Arabia.

Career 
Oppenheim served at the UK Mission to the UN in New York before he joined the Foreign & Commonwealth Office (FCO) in 2002. Between 2004 and 2009, he was posted to the Middle East, where he studied Arabic in Damascus and subsequently served in Muscat, Basra and then as Head of Political Section in Baghdad (2008–09). From 2010 to 2016 he served as Head of Climate and Energy (2011–15) and Political Counsellor overseeing Foreign and Security policy co-operation (2015–16) in Japan. From 2017 to 2018, Oppenheim was the UK Commonwealth Envoy, representing the UK on the Board of Governors of the Commonwealth Secretariat and co-ordinating FCO preparations for the London hosted CHOGM in April 2018.

References 

Living people
Ambassadors of the United Kingdom to Yemen
20th-century British diplomats
Year of birth missing (living people)